Andrew Brown (born c. 1860 in Kilmarnock; died c. 1930) was a Scottish footballer, who played for St Mirren and Scotland.

References

Sources

External links

London Hearts profile (Scotland)
London Hearts profile (Scottish League)

1860s births
1930s deaths
Year of birth uncertain
Year of death uncertain
Scottish footballers
Scotland international footballers
St Mirren F.C. players
Association football central defenders
Footballers from Kilmarnock
Scottish Football League players
Scottish Football League representative players